The Bert T. Combs Mountain Parkway, commonly known as the Mountain Parkway, is a freeway in eastern Kentucky. The route runs from Interstate 64 just east of Winchester southeast for 75.627 miles (121.710 km) to a junction with U.S. Route 460 near Salyersville.  The first , beginning at the western terminus in Winchester is a four-lane limited access highway with only minor design standard differences from an Interstate Highway, while the remainder is a limited access Super two highway.

History

The Bert T. Combs Mountain Parkway was built in the early 1960s and opened in January 1963 as Kentucky's second toll road.
The route was originally signed only as the 'Mountain Parkway'. In the late 1970s, the "Bert T. Combs" name was added to honor the governor from the mountains who spearheaded construction of the highway. Auxiliary plates were added above the circular Mountain Parkway signs to mark the designation.

As with all of Kentucky's toll roads, the tolls were removed as the construction bonds were paid off. Tolls were removed from the four-lane section in 1985, and the road became a freeway in 1986 when the remaining tolls were removed from the two-lane section.

The route was designated Kentucky Route 114 in April 1985. In August, the road was redesignated Kentucky Route 402. Later, in February 1990, the parkway was designated Kentucky Route 9000 from its western terminus to Kentucky Route 15 Spur near Campton and Kentucky Route 9009 from KY 15 Spur to the parkway's eastern terminus. Both designations are unsigned.

On January 15, 2014, Kentucky governor Steve Beshear announced plans to extend the parkway to US 23 in Prestonsburg, which would include widening the highway to four lanes for its entire length. The project, which would cost more than $750 million and requires approval by the Kentucky General Assembly, would run through 2020, and is expected to lead to the reinstatement of tolls on the highway. On July 26, 2019, Matt Bevin announced a $70M plan to expand the parkway.

Exit list

References

External links

Mountain Parkway exit list

 

9000
Two-lane freeways in the United States
Kentucky parkway system